The American Conservatory Theater (A.C.T.) is a nonprofit theater company in San Francisco, California, United States, that offers both classical and contemporary theater productions. It also has an attached acting school.

History
The American Conservatory Theater was founded in 1965 in Pittsburgh, Pennsylvania, by theatre and opera director William Ball in conjunction with the Pittsburgh Playhouse and Carnegie Mellon University. Ball presented twenty-seven fully staged productions in rotating repertory, in two different theaters – the Geary Theater and the Marines Memorial Theatre – during the first 40-week season.

A.C.T.'s original twenty-seven member acting company featured René Auberjonois, Peter Donat, Richard Dysart, Michael Learned, Ruth Kobart, Paul Shenar, Charles Siebert, Ken Ruta, and Kitty Winn among others. Ball's mid-1970s productions of Shakespeare's Taming of the Shrew, starring Marc Singer, and Rostand's Cyrano de Bergerac, starring Peter Donat and Marsha Mason, were televised by PBS.

In the mid-1980s, Ball, suffering from exhaustion and under accusations of financial mismanagement, was forced to relinquish his post as artistic director. He was succeeded by A.C.T. founding member and stage director Edward Hastings, who revived the company's fortunes until the Geary Theater was severely damaged by the 1989 Loma Prieta earthquake. The company continued performing in a number of San Francisco venues.

Carey Perloff served as A.C.T.'s artistic director from 1992 to 2018. In 2007, A.C.T. released a cast album of Perloff's production of the Bertolt Brecht and Kurt Weill musical Happy End, produced by LucasArts studios. It includes the full score and is the first English language recording of this musical. Pam MacKinnon was appointed to succeed Perloff as artistic director, effective with the end of the 2017–2018 season.

Theaters
A.C.T.'s primary home in San Francisco is the Geary Theater, located at 415 Geary Street near the corner of Mason Street in the Theatre District of San Francisco. Built in 1910 and designed by Walter D. Bliss and William B. Faville in the Classical Revival and Late Victorian styles, it was previously known as the Columbia Theater. The Geary Theater was listed on the National Register of Historic Places on May 27, 1975, and was designated an official San Francisco Landmark on July 11, 1976.

In 2015, A.C.T. opened the Strand Theater at 1127 Market Street between 7th and 8th Streets, across from the U.N. Plaza in the Civic Center neighborhood of San Francisco.  The building has a 283-seat theater as well as a 120-seat event and performance space.  A.C.T. utilizes the theater to present educational workshops, cabaret performances and specially commissioned new works, as well as productions connected to their M.F.A. and Young Conservatory programs.

Acting school
A.C.T.'s conservatory is accredited to grant Master of Fine Arts degrees for actors. The current director of the conservatory MFA program is Danyon Davis. 

In addition to the MFA program, A.C.T. offers training through the Studio A.C.T., the Summer Training Congress, and Young Conservatory programs.

Young Conservatory
A.C.T.'s Young Conservatory is a theater training program for youth through the ages of 19. It was founded by Luanne and Ross Graham in 1971. Successive YC directors include Candace Birk, Sharon Newman, Linda Aldrich, and Susan Stauter. The program has been led since 1988 by Craig Slaight. The Young Conservatory is geared toward performing new works specifically for young actors, and has premiered plays and musicals by playwrights such as Horton Foote and Paul Zindel. The conservatory members are also offered roles in the main stage productions, most frequently A Christmas Carol, which is performed every winter.

Sound design
The first person to be given the title sound designer in regional theater was Dan Dugan at A.C.T. in the late 1960s. The term Sound Design was introduced to the film world when Francis Ford Coppola directed a production of Private Lives at A.C.T. which his father, Carmine Coppola, arranged the music and Charlie Richmond was the sound designer while the final cut of the film The Godfather was being edited in 1972.

Alumni

Directors

Young conservatory actors 

 Zendaya

Actors 

 Amy Irving
 Anna Belknap
 Annette Bening
 Anika Noni Rose
 Benjamin Bratt
 Brie Larson
 Dane Witherspoon
 Danny Glover
 Denzel Washington
 Don Johnson
 Elizabeth Banks
 Elizabeth McGovern
 Gedde Watanabe
 Harry Hamlin
 Justin Whalin
 Mfoniso Udofia
 Omar Metwally
 Sacheen Littlefeather
 Teri Hatcher
 Winona Ryder

Sound design 
 Dan Dugan

See also
 List of San Francisco Designated Landmarks
 American Musical Theatre of San Jose

References

External links

American Conservatory Theater official website

View a 1969 documentary film about A.C.T., made by KQED (TV)

Theatres in San Francisco
Theatre companies in San Francisco
Drama schools in the United States
League of Resident Theatres
Regional theatre in the United States
Schools in San Francisco
Tony Award winners
National Register of Historic Places in San Francisco
San Francisco Designated Landmarks
Theatres on the National Register of Historic Places in California
Performing groups established in 1965
1910 establishments in California
Theatres completed in 1910
Bliss and Faville buildings
Neoclassical architecture in California
Victorian architecture in California